Michael Swissa (born January 10, 1996), or simply Swissa, is an Israeli rapper, singer and songwriter.

Biography 
Swissa is son of the Israeli actor Meir Swissa and Ruti, daughter of Israeli singer Yafa Yarkoni. His brother is Israeli record producer Yishai Swissa.

He began his career in 2014, after he released his first song "Krav Maga".

In 2016 he appeared on humorist clips on the Israeli series "Good Night with Asaf Harel" on Channel 10. In 2018 he released his first mixtape Male Be'atzmi (English stylized: FullOfMyself), the mixtape includes guest appearances from Tal Tirangel, Michael Moshonov and more.

In 2019 he collaborated with McDonald's Israel on campaign with the song "Ach Yakar Tzover" featuring Achshtaim.

Discography 
 #SwissaLanetzach (2016)
 FullOfMyself (2018)
 Glisha Baseter (with Michael Cohen) (2019)

References 

21st-century Israeli male singers
Israeli rappers
1996 births
Musicians from Tel Aviv
Living people